Ski Mistress is a 1981  Italian sex comedy film directed by  Alessandro Lucidi and starring Carmen Russo.

Plot

Cast 

 Carmen Russo as Celia Berni 
 Andy Luotto as  Franco 
 Cinzia De Ponti as  Carla
 Daniele Vargas as Emir Hussein
 Sonia Otero as  Stella
 Renzo Ozzano as  Walter A. Thompson 
 Ghigo Masino as  Hotel Manager
 Giacomo Rizzo as Kidnapper

See also
 List of Italian films of 1981

References

External links

Commedia sexy all'italiana
1980s sex comedy films
Films scored by Stelvio Cipriani
Films set in Pescara
Films shot in Pescara
1981 comedy films
1981 films
1980s Italian films